Caranavi is the capital of the Caranavi Province in the Yungas region of Bolivia.

On 23 December 2009, part of the province was detached from the municipality of Caranavi to become the municipality of Alto Beni.

Geography
Caranavi is north of Coroico, on the road from La Paz to Rurrenabaque. It is in mountainous terrain at the confluence of the Yara and Coroico Rivers.

References

Populated places in La Paz Department (Bolivia)